The Agušaya Hymn or Song of Agušaya is an Old Babylonian literary work, a “song of praise”, written in the Akkadian language concerning the goddess Ištar, identified with the serpent deity Irnina. It may have been called “the Snake has Turned” in antiquity, as it has ú-ta-ar MUŠ inscribed at the top edge at the beginning.  It is extant on two unprovenanced tablets, designated  A and B, the latter of which includes a request for eternal life for king Hammurabi (reigned c. 1792 BC to c. 1750 BC), on the fifth column, 26th line, for whom it is thought to have been composed as an epic hymn of celebration of “the mad dancer in battle”. It is arranged into ten kirugú-stanzas (Akkadian: šēru) and six ĝešgiĝal-antiphons as lyrical retorts, the numbering of which suggest that the work extends over the two tablets, although the second may not be the actual sequel of the first as the first is an eight column tablet while the second only has six columns and there are apparently subtle differences in late Old Babylonian cursive cuneiform distinguishing them, suggesting tablet A is the younger copy.

The text

Among the most difficult literary texts in Old Babylonian, the work opens lu-na-i-id šu-ur-bu-ta, “let me praise the greatest”. Ištar, the goddess of fertility and war, is terrifying to the gods with her wild, ferocious and "virile" antics. “She dances around gods and kings in her manliness” and “young men are cut off as if for spears.”

The god Ea, who is angered by her outrageous behavior, fashions a suitable counterfoil, Ṣāltum, “discord” out of the dirt beneath his fingernails, to provide her with distraction, somewhat reminiscent of the purpose of Enkidu in the Epic of Gilgamesh. Ea tells Ṣāltum he has created her to humiliate Ištar and sends this ferocious beast to challenge her. Much of the subsequent text is fragmentary, however the adversaries seem to engage in a protracted whirling dance of battle. Finally, Ištar entreats Ea to save her from this monstrous virago, “May she return to her cave! Ea opened his mouth and the hero of the gods spoke to Agušaya: ‘to be sure, as soon as you said it, I will do (it).’”

With Ištar's taming,  Ea proposes the instigation of an annual Ištar festival, providing an explanation for the origin of the guštum, a whirling dance performed during the festivities, commemorating the war-like character of Ištar.

Principal publications

  line art for  Agušaya A
  translation of Agušaya A
  transliteration and translation of Agušaya A and B
 
  reproduces her 1972 dissertation transliteration and translation of Agušaya A
 
  translation
  transliteration and translation of Agušaya A and B
 
  provides philological notes to his new translations posted online at SEAL references 2.1.5.1 and 2.1.5.2.

Inscriptions

References

18th-century BC literature
Mesopotamian myths
Akkadian literature
Clay tablets
Inanna
Hymns